Simon Guglielmi (born 1 July 1997 in Chambéry) is a French cyclist, who currently rides for UCI WorldTeam . In October 2020, he was named in the startlist for the 2020 Giro d'Italia.

Major results
2016
 2nd Overall Grand Prix Chantal Biya
1st  Mountains classification
1st  Young rider classification
2017
 7th Ghent–Wevelgem U23
2018
 8th Overall Kreiz Breizh Elites
 8th Paris–Tours Espoirs
2019
 1st  Mountains classification Tour Alsace
 8th Overall Giro Ciclistico d'Italia
 9th Piccolo Giro di Lombardia

Grand Tour general classification results timeline

References

External links

1997 births
Living people
French male cyclists
Sportspeople from Chambéry